"Touch Me in the Morning" is a song recorded by Diana Ross on the Motown label. It was written by Ron Miller and Michael Masser, and produced by the latter and Tom Baird. It was released on May 3, 1973 as the first single from her album of the same name. In 1973, it became Ross's second solo No. 1 single on the Billboard Hot 100.

Background/Recording
It was conceived by then-unproven songwriter and producer Michael Masser. He had been recruited by Motown CEO Berry Gordy and A&R chief Suzanne de Passe. Masser teamed up with the proven ballad lyricist Ron Miller to write it.

According to Masser, in a video documentary about Ross, she "always tried to push hard to get the vocals right for this particular song", calling it a "draining experience" that resulted in several near-emotional breakdowns when she wasn't up to her abilities. It was recorded in the early morning hours, as was her custom after she began raising her children. In a Barbara Walters Mother's Day interview special, her second-oldest daughter, Tracee Ellis Ross, said Diana would put them to bed and record all night, in order to wake her children and send them to school the next morning.

Release
Motown released the song as a single and it hit No. 1 on the Billboard Hot 100 singles chart, becoming her longest-charting record until 1980, remaining on the chart for 21 weeks.  It also spent a week at No. 1 on the adult contemporary chart, her first No. 1 on that chart.  Sherlie Matthews, Clydie King and Venetta Fields sang background vocals. Bob Babbitt played bass.

It marked a turning point in the career of Diana Ross, reinvigorating her singing career, coming immediately after her Academy Award nomination for Best Actress in her acting debut, Lady Sings the Blues.

Charts

Weekly charts

Year-end charts

References

Bibliography
 Whitburn, Joel (1996). The Billboard Book of Top 40 Hits, 6th Edition (Billboard Publications)

External links
 List of cover versions of "Touch Me in the Morning" at SecondHandSongs.com
 

1973 singles
Songs written by Ron Miller (songwriter)
Songs written by Michael Masser
Diana Ross songs
Andy Williams songs
The Nolans songs
Billboard Hot 100 number-one singles
Cashbox number-one singles
Motown singles
1973 songs
Pop ballads
Rhythm and blues ballads